The 5 øre coin was made during the German occupation of Denmark. It was first minted in aluminum in 1941, and then from 1942 to 1945 in zinc. The aluminum 5 øre is similar to the zinc variety, although the latter is a little smaller in diameter and heavier in weight.

Mintage
1941 aluminum

1942-1945 zinc

References

Denmark in World War II
Modern obsolete currencies
Coins of Denmark
Zinc and aluminum coins minted in Germany and occupied territories during World War II
Five-cent coins